Wiedomys is a genus of South American rodents in the family Cricetidae. It contains the following species:
 Cerrado red-nosed mouse (Wiedomys cerradensis)
 Red-nosed mouse (Wiedomys pyrrhorhinos)

References

 
Rodent genera
Endemic fauna of Brazil
Taxa named by Philip Hershkovitz